An onzil (or osele or musele) is a throwing knife of ethnic groups from eastern Gabon (Kota, Fang, Mbété).

Uses 
Looking like an axe, the onzil has a calao-shaped blade. Its handle, often made of wood, is covered with copper wire, iron or brass. Sometimes handles are made of ivory. The onzil served as sacrificial weapons or for the war. The Kotas called them osele or musele, and the Fangs called them onzil. The name remained. Early forms of this style knife, associated with the Fang people, had shorter straight handles. Kota people are neighbors of the Fang and likely from them adopted this style of knife.

Gallery

Bibliography 
 Jan Elsen, De fer et de fierté, Armes blanches d’Afrique noire du Musée Barbier-Mueller, 5 Continents Editions, Milan, 2003, 
 Louis Perrois, L'esprit de la forêt : terres du Gabon, 1997, p. 141 
 Manfred A.Zirngibl-Werner Fischer, Afrikanische Waffen

References

Blade weapons
Throwing axes
Axes
African weapons
Daggers
Knives
Throwing weapons